Artificial Intelligence: A Modern Approach (AIMA) is a university textbook on artificial intelligence, written by Stuart J. Russell and Peter Norvig. It was first published in 1995 and the fourth edition of the book was released on 28 April 2020. It is used in over 1400 universities worldwide and has been called "the most popular artificial intelligence textbook in the world". It is considered the standard text in the field of artificial intelligence.

The book is intended for an undergraduate audience but can also be used for graduate-level studies with the suggestion of adding some of the primary sources listed in the extensive bibliography.  Programs in the book are presented in pseudo code with implementations in Java, Python, and Lisp available online. There are also unsupported implementations in Prolog, C++, C#, and several other languages. A GitHub repository exists that is dedicated to implementations of the subject material.

Editions 

 1st 1995, red cover
 2nd 2003, green cover
 3rd 2009 
 4th 2020

References

External links
 
 

1995 non-fiction books
2003 non-fiction books
2009 non-fiction books
2020 non-fiction books
Artificial intelligence publications
Cognitive science literature
Computer science textbooks
English-language books
Robotics books
Prentice Hall books